Dronamraju Krishna Rao (14 January 1937 – 3 December 2020) was an Indian-born geneticist and president of the Foundation for Genetic Research in Houston, Texas. He was born in Pithapuram, in the state of Andhra Pradesh, India. One focus of his work has been the research of his mentor J. B. S. Haldane. As an author, his name is usually rendered Krishna R. Dronamraju. He died in Houston at age 83.

Biography

Education
Dronamraju went to M. R. College in Vizianagaram, Andhra University to study botany and earned a bachelor's degree in 1955. He received a master's degree from Agra University in 1957; he studied plant breeding and genetics. When J.B.S. Haldane moved to India in 1957, Dronamraju wrote to Haldane for an opportunity to pursue a research career under his direction at the Indian Statistical Institute in Calcutta.

Early in his research career, he discovered the first case of a gene on the human Y chromosome and published a paper in 1960. It was also part of his PhD thesis at the Indian Statistical Institute, Calcutta. Dronamraju's research with Haldane at the Indian Statistical Institute included many areas.

Research contributions
Dronamraju's research covered the visits of several species of lepidoptera to different colored flowers of Lantana camara reported the discovery of a species-specific pattern of color preference behavior by pollinating insects.

He did research in human genetics in India. In 1966, Dronamraju completed his PhD from the Indian Statistical Institute, Calcutta. He studied under J. B. S. Haldane. The topic of his doctoral thesis was "Genetic Studies of the Andhra Pradesh population". Dronamraju's early research in human genetics (and the independent work of L.D. Saghvi at the Tata Cancer Center in Mumbai) eventually led to the foundation of the Indian Society of Human Genetics.

Dronamraju received advanced training at University College, London and Johns Hopkins School of Medicine, followed by a postdoctoral fellowship in genetics at the University of Alberta. After he moved to the US, he continued research on inbreeding in human populations such as the Amish population in Pennsylvania in collaboration with Victor A. McKusick at Johns Hopkins. He also studied the Seneca Indians in New York State and other populations in the US and Canada.

He studied the relationship between fetal mortality and the occurrence of oral cleft defects in families.

In recent years, Dronamraju's research focused on the history of genetics and human/medical genetics. He published several books, especially with reference to the contributions of his mentor J. B. S. Haldane.

Books
   "A Century of Geneticists: Mutation to Medicine", CRC Press, Taylor and Francis Company, London, UK, 2018.{ISBN/978-1-498-74866-7}  
 Popularizing Science: The Life and Work of JBS Haldane. (2017) Oxford University Press 
 Victor McKusick and the History of Medical Genetics. (2012) Springer 
 Haldane, Mayr and Beanbag Genetics (2011) Oxford University Press 
 What I Require from Life: Writings on Science and Life from JBS Haldane (2009) Oxford University Press 
 Emerging Consequences of Biotechnology (2008), World Scientific Publishing Company 
 Genetic and Evolutionary Aspects of Malaria (2006), Springer 
 Infectious Disease and Host-Pathogen Evolution (2004), Cambridge University Press 
 Biological Wealth and Other Essays (2002), World Scientific Publishing Company ASIN B-001-T63O7-0
 Science and Society (1998), University Press of America 
 Biological and Social Issues in Biotechnology Sharing (1998), Ashgate Publishing 
 Haldane's Daedalus Revisited (1995), Oxford University Press 
 The History and Development of Human Genetics in Different Countries (1993), World Scientific Publishing 
 If I am To Be Remembered: The Life and Work of Julian Huxley (1992), World Scientific Publishing ASIN B-001-KJODG-M
 Selected Genetic Papers of JBS Haldane (1990), Garland Science 
 The Foundations of Human Genetics (1989), Charles C Thomas Pub Ltd 
 Cleft Lip and Palate: Aspects of Reproductive Biology (1986), Charles C Thomas Pub Ltd 
 Haldane: The Life and Work of JBS Haldane with special reference to India (1985), Pergamon Pr 
 Haldane and Modern Biology (1968), The Johns Hopkins University Press 
 Haldane in India (1998)

Achievements

Awards
 National Research Service Award (NRSA) from the U.S. National Institutes of Health in Washington D.C.
 Yellapraggada Subba Rao Memorial Award, India.
 Nayudamma Award in Technology, India.

Concurrent positions
 Honorary Professor, Albert Schweitzer Institute, Geneva, Switzerland
 Invited Professor, University of Paris, France
 Honorary Visiting Professor, Andhra University, India
 Honorary Research Fellow, University of London, UK.
 Chairman, International Advisory Committee, Chemtech Corp.
 Adjunct Professor, Pennsylvania State University.
 Advisor, The Science Garage, Hyderabad, India

References

External links
 Official Website 
 Dronamraju in Mathematics Genealogy Project
 Noted Texas artist Dorothy Hood on Dronamraju Krishna Rao

1937 births
2020 deaths
Telugu people
Evolutionary biologists
Indian bioinformaticians
Population geneticists
Academics of the University of London
Alumni of University College London
Dr. Bhimrao Ambedkar University alumni
Indian geneticists
Pennsylvania State University faculty
People from East Godavari district
Scientists from Andhra Pradesh
20th-century Indian biologists